Pseudochalcothea auripes is a beetle  of the family Scarabaeidae and subfamily Cetoniinae.

Description and Distribution
It is endemic to Malaysia and  Borneo.

References

, 1993. Note on the Genus Pseudochalcothea  (Coleoptera, Scarabaeidae, Cetoniinae) from Borneo. Gekkan-Mushi (269): 4–11. 
Zipcodezoo
Biolib

Cetoniinae
Beetles described in 1874